Ronnie A. Sabb (born September 2, 1958) is a Democratic member of the South Carolina Senate, representing the 32nd District since 2014. He is an attorney.

References

1958 births
Living people
African-American state legislators in South Carolina
Democratic Party South Carolina state senators
21st-century American politicians
21st-century African-American politicians
20th-century African-American people